Satyabrata Tripathy (Popular as Kuna Tripathy) is an Indian actor, radio personality, VJ (media personality) and television presenter, who mostly work on Odia language films and television shows. He is appointed as the chairman of Odisha Film Development Corporation by the Government of Odisha in 2018. In his career, he has worked is Script, Lyrics, Dialogue & Direction. He has also scripted and directed many Docu-Dramas, and telefilms.

Career
Kuna Tripathy has acted in films like ‘Bandhu’, ‘Mo Dil Kahe Ilu Ilu’ and ‘Love Dot Com’. He worked as a radio artist on All India Radio(AIR), Cuttack. He earned fame with the Odia-language satirical show ‘News Fuse’, which is known as the best news spoof programme of Odisha.

Kuna Tripathy started his career at the age of 6 in a stage drama, and by that time he had also worked in Shishu Sansar (All India Radio). He has also worked in prominent radio stationsof India such as All India Radio (Cuttack) & Vividh Bharati from the year1988 to 1999. In 1995, he participated in an Odia theatre drama, Satarka Sanghamitra of AIR which won the Best Play in India award.

He made his debut in the year 1987 through the Hindi movie 'Sopan'. Besides that, he has also appeared in other Odia movies such as 'Kiye Kahara' (1997), 'Maa Gojabayani' (1998), Lat Sahib, Rakata Chinhichi Nijara Kiye (1999 Superhit), Samaya Chakra Re Sansara Ratha, Nari Akhi Re Nia, Tate Mo Rana, Tu Mo Akhi Ra Tara, Dharma Ra Haba Jaye, Satyameva Jayate, Pila Ta Bigidi Gala, Tu Eka Mo Saha Bharasa, Prem Kumar. He has also acted in two Bengali movies - Bichu Chelly & Bhandhu.

Political career
Tripathy is a member of Biju Janata Dal or known as BJD joined in 2016. When Tripathy was appointed as chair of Odisha Film Development Corporation by the governing party and as a member of the party, he left the show 'News Fuse'. Because the show has been boycotted by BJD and they has been accused the show in the past to be anti-government and pro-BJP.

Television 
Tripathy made his small screen debut in the year 1995 with the Odia Mega Serial, 'Kahuthile Saribani'. Along with that, he has played roles in some popular TV shows like Samparka, Duhita, Sara Akasha, Je Pakhi Ude Jete Dura, Dasi, Rajaniti and Tulasi.

He worked on the show News Fuse from 2008 until 2018, when he became the host of the satire show Bampha in Nandighosa TV.

Personal life
Satyabrata "Kuna" Tripathy, born on 22 January 1968, completed his master's degree in Arts from Ravenshaw University. He has always paid respect to Late actor Parbati Ghose as his Guru and mother. Married to Sangeeta Tripathy, he has two daughters - Shreya & Shloka Tripathy. As the master of all dialects of Odisha and with gripping command over Sanskrit Shlokas, he has been travelling to countries  like USA, Australia, UAE, Oman to propagate Odisha and Jagannath Culture.

Filmography

References

External links

 

Living people
Male actors from Odisha
Indian male film actors
Year of birth missing (living people)